Indonesian Space Agency or INASA is the Indonesian space agency engaged in activities related to outer space and space exploration policy. INASA differs compared to Research Organization for Aeronautics and Space (ORPA), because INASA does not perform space research activities, but is more a coordinative agency and is designed as a space lobby and policy making agency.

History 
Before being dismantled, The National Institute of Aeronautics and Space (LAPAN) was both the research institute and policy making institution for outer space and space exploration in Indonesia. As mandated by Law No. 21/2013, LAPAN was mandated to perform space research activity in both policy research and experimental research, performing space lobby and negotiations with the space agency of another country or supranational entities or international bodies, coordinating policies in space policy, and registration of astronomical objects.

LAPAN was liquidated on 1 September 2021 in favor for formation of integrated super-agency, the National Research and Innovation Agency (BRIN). By Presidential Decree No. 78/2021, LAPAN was mandated to relinquish its rights and responsibilities to BRIN. While the research functions of the former LAPAN were swiftly subsumed into BRIN, its political functions were not yet reorganized into BRIN. As result of LAPAN liquidation, for a brief time, Indonesia technically did not have functioning space agency as mandated by Law No. 21/2013; solely a space research agency.

In March 2022, INASA was formed as a special body under BRIN for Indonesia to carry on space political functions, including coordinating space policies, political lobby, preparation and delegation of Indonesian space scientists to lobby and negotiate with space agency of another country or supranational entities or international bodies, and registration of astronomical objects. Formation of INASA in BRIN has the goal of separating research functions from political functions, so both function not mixed.

References 

Science and technology in Indonesia
Space agencies
Space program of Indonesia
2022 establishments in Indonesia
National Research and Innovation Agency